Castra Arcidava was a fort in the Roman province of Dacia in the area of the town of Arcidava (now Vărădia, Romania) in the 2nd and 3rd centuries AD.

See also
List of castra

External links
Roman castra from Romania - Google Maps / Earth

Notes

Roman Dacia
Archaeological sites in Romania
Roman legionary fortresses in Romania
History of Banat
Historic monuments in Caraș-Severin County

ro:Castrul roman Arcidava